Dojč is a village and municipality in Senica District in the Trnava Region of western Slovakia.

Geography 
The village is located in the Záhorie lowland, around 10 km west of Senica at an altitude of 180 metres. It has 1 263 inhabitants as of 2008 and has a land area of 20.367 km2.

History 
In historical records the village was first mentioned in 1392.

Genealogical resources

The records for genealogical research are available at the state archive "Statny Archiv in Bratislava, Slovakia"

 Roman Catholic church records (births/marriages/deaths): 1668-1895 (parish A)
 Lutheran church records (births/marriages/deaths): 1835-1875 (parish B)

See also
 List of municipalities and towns in Slovakia

References

External links 

 Official page
 https://web.archive.org/web/20080111223415/http://www.statistics.sk/mosmis/eng/run.html
Surnames of living people in Dojc

Villages and municipalities in Senica District